Old Europe is a term coined by the Lithuanian archaeologist Marija Gimbutas to describe what she perceived as a relatively homogeneous pre-Indo-European Neolithic and Copper Age culture or civilisation in Southeastern Europe and part of Central-Eastern Europe, centred in the Danube Valley. Old Europe is also referred to in some literature as the Danube civilisation. 

The term 'Danubian culture' was earlier coined by the archaeologist Vere Gordon Childe to describe early farming cultures (e.g. the Linear Pottery culture) which spread westwards and northwards from the Danube Valley into Central and Eastern Europe.

Old Europe

Old Europe, or Neolithic Europe, refers to the time between the Mesolithic and Bronze Age periods in Europe, roughly from 7000 BCE (the approximate time of the first farming societies in Greece) to c. 2000 BCE (the beginning of the Bronze Age in Scandinavia). The duration of the Neolithic varies from place to place: in Southeastern Europe it is approximately 4000 years (i.e., 7000−3000 BCE); in parts of North-West Europe it is just under 3000 years (c. 4500−2000 BCE).

Regardless of specific chronology, many European Neolithic groups share basic characteristics, such as living in small-scale communities, more egalitarian than the city-states and chiefdoms of the Bronze Age, subsisting on domestic plants and animals supplemented with the collection of wild plant foods and hunting, and producing hand-made pottery, without the aid of the potter's wheel. There are also many differences, with some Neolithic communities in southeastern Europe living in heavily fortified settlements of 3,000–4,000 people (e.g. Sesklo in Greece) whereas Neolithic groups in Britain were usually small (possibly 50–100 people).

Marija Gimbutas studied the Neolithic period in order to understand cultural developments in settled village culture in the southern Balkans, which she characterized as peaceful, matristic, and possessing a goddess-centered religion. In contrast, she characterizes the later Indo-European influences as warlike, nomadic, and patrilineal. Using evidence from pottery and sculpture, and combining the tools of archaeology, comparative mythology, linguistics, and, most controversially, folkloristics, Gimbutas invented a new interdisciplinary field, archaeomythology.

In historical times, some ethnonyms are believed to correspond to Pre-Indo-European peoples, assumed to be the descendants of the earlier Old European cultures: the Pelasgians, Minoans, Leleges, Iberians, Nuragic people, Etruscans, Rhaetians, Camunni and Basques. Two of the three pre-Greek peoples of Sicily, the Sicans and the Elymians, may also have been pre-Indo-European. 

How many Pre-Indo-European languages existed is not known. Nor is it known whether the ancient names of peoples descended from the pre-ancient population actually referred to speakers of distinct languages. Gimbutas (1989), observing a unity of symbols marked especially on pots, but also on other objects, concluded that there may have been a single language spoken in Old Europe. She thought that decipherment would have to wait for the discovery of bilingual texts.

The idea of a Pre-Indo-European language in the region precedes Gimbutas. It went by other names, such as "Pelasgian", "Mediterranean", or "Aegean". Apart from marks on artifacts, the main evidence concerning Pre-Indo-European language is in names: toponyms, ethnonyms, etc., and in roots in other languages believed to be derived from one or more prior languages, possibly unrelated. Reconstruction from the evidence is an accepted, though somewhat speculative, field of study. Suggestions of possible Old European languages include Urbian by Sorin Paliga, and the Vasconic substratum hypothesis of Theo Vennemann (also see Sigmund Feist's Germanic substrate hypothesis).

Indo-European origins

According to Gimbutas' version of the Kurgan hypothesis, Old Europe was invaded and destroyed by horse-riding pastoral nomads from the Pontic–Caspian steppe (the "Kurgan culture") who brought with them violence, patriarchy, and Indo-European languages. More recent proponents of the Kurgan hypothesis agree that the cultures of Old Europe spoke pre-Indo-European languages but include a less dramatic transition, with a prolonged migration of Proto-Indo-European speakers after Old Europe's collapse due to other factors.

Colin Renfrew's competing Anatolian hypothesis suggests that the Indo-European languages were spread across Europe by the first farmers from Anatolia. In the hypothesis' original formulation, the languages of Old Europe belonged to the Indo-European family but played no special role in its transmission. According to Renfrew's most recent revision of the theory, however, Old Europe was a "secondary urheimat" (linguistic homeland) where the Greek, Armenian, and Balto-Slavic language families diverged around 5000 BCE. Three genetic studies in 2015 gave partial support to the Steppe theory regarding the Indo-European Urheimat. According to those studies, haplogroups R1b and R1a, now the most common in Europe (R1a is also common in South Asia) would have expanded from the steppes north of the Pontic and Caspian seas, along with at least some of the Indo-European languages; they also detected an autosomal component present in modern Europeans which was not present in Neolithic Europeans, which would have been introduced with paternal lineages R1b and R1a, as well as Indo-European languages.

Gallery

Artefacts

Settlements

See also
 
Prehistoric Europe
Early European Farmers
Prehistory of Southeastern Europe
Vinča script
Petrești culture
Tell Yunatsite
Proto-Indo-European language
Proto-Indo-Europeans
Indo-Iranian migration
Pre-Greek substrate
Germanic substrate hypothesis
Goidelic substrate hypothesis
Anatolian hypothesis

References

Further reading
 
 
 
 
 
 
 
 
 
 
 Bellwood, Peter. (2004). First Farmers: The Origins of Agricultural Societies. Blackwell Publishers. 
 
 Gimbutas, Marija (1982). The Goddesses and Gods of Old Europe: 6500–3500 B.C.: Myths, and Cult Images Berkeley: University of California Press. 
 Gimbutas, Marija (1989). The Language of the Goddess. Harper & Row, Publishers. .
 Gimbutas, Marija (1991). The Civilization of the Goddess. San Francisco: Harper. .

External links

The Lost World of Old Europe: The Danube Valley, 5000-3500 BC, Institute for the Study of the Ancient World, exhibition video (2010)
The Lost World of Old Europe: The Danube Valley, 5000-3500 BC, Museum of Cycladic Art, Athens, exhibition video, 2010
Institute for the Study of the Ancient World : Neolithic and Copper Age
culture.gouv.fr: Life along the Danube 6500 years ago
Kathleen Jenks, "Old Europe": further links

Pre-Indo-Europeans
Archaeological theory
Neolithic Europe